Gooney Bird and the Room Mother is a 2005 novel by Lois Lowry.

External links
Lowry's website

2005 American novels
2005 children's books
American children's novels
Books about birds
Novels by Lois Lowry